Kangryŏng County is a county in the South Hwanghae province of North Korea.

Geography
Kangryŏng is bordered to the north by Pyŏksŏng, to the west by Ongjin, to the east by the Bay of Haeju and to the south by the Korea Bay. The county is situated on the western half of the Ongjin Peninsula, and most of the land is rocky and hilly with many coves and little flat land. There are also many islands in the seas surrounding the county, the largest being Sunwi-do, Ŏhwa-do, and the Suap Islands. The highest point is Mt. Ch'amnamu, at 286 meters.

Kangryŏng is famous for its seafaring bird populations, including the rare red-crowned crane. The county is the site of the large Kangryong Crane Habitat, one of four designated breeding sites in North Korea, and Natural Monument #130.

History
Kangryŏng county was created under the Yi dynasty. It was briefly merged into the newly formed Hwanghae District in 1895 during an experimental redistricting, but was restored to its previous form in 1896. In 1909, it was incorporated into Ongjin. It was again made an independent municipality in the 1952 redistricting changes and received its old name.

Transportation
Kangryŏng county is served by the Ongjin and Pup'o lines of the Korean State Railway, as well as an extensive network of roads.

Administrative divisions
Kangryŏng is divided into one town (ŭp), one Worker's District (rodongjagu) and 31 villages (ri).

See also
Geography of North Korea
Administrative divisions of North Korea

References

Counties of South Hwanghae